The Game Awards 2019 was an award show that honored the best video games of 2019. The event was produced and hosted by Geoff Keighley, creator and producer of The Game Awards, and was held to an invited audience at the Microsoft Theater in Los Angeles on December 12, 2019. The preshow ceremony was hosted by Sydnee Goodman. The event was live streamed across more than 50 digital platforms; it was the first to broadcast live in India and was simulcast in 53 movie theaters across the United States. The show featured musical performances from Chvrches, Grimes, and Green Day, and presentations from celebrity guests including Stephen Curry, Vin Diesel, Norman Reedus, and Michelle Rodriguez. In association with the event, a virtual games festival was held online, allowing free demos to be played through Steam over a 48-hour period.

Death Stranding received ten nominations, the most of any Game Awards to date, while Disco Elysium tied for the highest-awarded game in the show's history with four wins. Sekiro: Shadows Die Twice was awarded Game of the Year. Several new games were revealed during the show, including Bravely Default II, Godfall, and Senua's Saga: Hellblade II, and Microsoft revealed the Xbox Series X as the successor to the Xbox One. Death Strandings nominations prompted allegations of impropriety due to Keighley's friendship with game director Hideo Kojima; Keighley clarified he does not partake in voting. Reviews for the ceremony were mixed, with praise for announcements but criticism directed at the decreasing focus on awards. The show was viewed by over 45 million streams, the most in its history to date, with 7.5 million concurrent viewers at its peak.

Background 

As with previous iterations of The Game Awards, the show was hosted and produced by Canadian games journalist Geoff Keighley. He returned as an executive producer alongside Kimmie H. Kim, and Richard Preuss and LeRoy Bennett returned as director and creative director, respectively. The preshow was hosted by Sydnee Goodman. The presentation was held at the Microsoft Theater in Los Angeles on December 12, 2019, and live streamed across more than 50 digital platforms, including Facebook, Twitch, Twitter, and YouTube. By partnering with Nodwin Gaming, the 2019 show was the first to broadcast live in India, on television via MTV and online through services such as JioTV, MX Player, and Voot. The show was simulcast in 53 Cinemark movie theaters across the United States alongside the opening night screening of Jumanji: The Next Level in partnership with Sony Pictures. Keighley had previously wanted to broadcast in theaters and felt the release of Jumanji—which largely focuses on a video game—was a perfect fit.

Keighley spent most of the year preparing for the show, as did about eight of the production's full-time staff; hundreds of contributors worked on the final show. In November, Kim worked 11-hour days to coordinate the show with contractors and decipher its pacing. During the ceremony, Keighley spoke to the animated character Mirage from Apex Legends for the announcement of the game's holiday event. The interaction took place in real-time, with actor Roger Craig Smith performing the movements through motion capture in a studio besides the Microsoft Theater. The game's creative director Drew Stauffer approached creative production studio The Mill in October 2018 with the idea. The Mill partnered with Cubic Motion to develop the technology, and with Animatrik for the motion capture movement. The production teams considered revealing the technology during the show, but opted to maintain the illusion until afterwards.

The show featured presenters such as Stephen Curry, Vin Diesel, and Norman Reedus, performances from Chvrches, Green Day, and Grimes. Keighley ensured the presenters and performers were relevant to the video games industry, wanting to avoid a "celebrity in the show for the sake of celebrity". Reggie Fils-Aimé's award presentation was his fifth for the show, and his first since retiring as president of Nintendo of America. The presentation from Bunsen Honeydew and Beaker marked the second appearance of Muppets, following Pepe the Prawn's appearance at The Game Awards 2018. In association with the event, a virtual games festival was held online from December 12–14, 2019. Several upcoming games released free demos through Steam, including Carrion, Spiritfarer, and Skatebird, available for 48 hours.

Announcements 
Valve announced it would showcase Half-Life: Alyx at the ceremony, but pulled out several hours prior to the event. Announcements on recently released and upcoming games were made for Apex Legends, Beat Saber, Black Desert Online, Control, Cyberpunk 2077, Gears Tactics, Ghost of Tsushima, Humankind, Magic: The Gathering Arena, New World, No More Heroes III, and Ori and the Will of the Wisps. New games announced during the ceremony included:

 Bravely Default II
 Convergence: A League of Legends Story
 Dungeons & Dragons: Dark Alliance
 Fast & Furious Crossroads
 Godfall
 Magic: Legends
 Naraka: Bladepoint
 Nine to Five
 Path of the Warrior
 Prologue
 Ruined King: A League of Legends Story
 Senua's Saga: Hellblade II
 Sons of the Forest
 Surgeon Simulator 2
 Ultimate Rivals: The Rink
 Weird West
 The Wolf Among Us 2

Additionally, Microsoft revealed the Xbox Series X as the successor to the Xbox One. The announcement was so secretive that Phil Spencer read a fake script about Xbox Game Pass during rehearsals. Godfalls reveal marked the first PlayStation 5 game to be announced.

Winners and nominees 
The nominees for The Game Awards 2019 were announced on November 19, 2019. Any game released on or before November 15, 2019 was eligible for consideration. The nominees were compiled by a jury panel with members from 80 media outlets globally. Winners were determined between the jury (90 percent) and public votes (10 percent); the latter was held via the official website. The exception was the Player's Voice award, fully nominated and voted-on by the public after three 24-hour votes that started with 24 games and ended with four. Public votes totaled 15.5 million, a 50 percent increase from the previous show. The show included new honorees of the Global Gaming Citizens award, in partnership with Facebook Gaming; two winners were announced at E3 2019, and the final three during the awards show alongside videos by Indie Game: The Movie directors Lisanne Pajot and James Swirsky.

Awards 

Winners are listed first, highlighted in boldface, and indicated with a double dagger.

Video games

Esports and creators

Games with multiple nominations and awards

Multiple nominations 
Death Stranding received ten nominations, the most in the show's history to date. Other games with multiple nominations included Control with eight and Sekiro: Shadows Die Twice with five. Nintendo had 15 total nominations, more than any other publisher, followed by Sony Interactive Entertainment with 12 and Activision with 10.

Multiple awards 
Disco Elysium received the most awards, winning all four of its nominations, tying for the highest-awarded game in the show's history to date. Death Stranding won three awards, while Fire Emblem: Three Houses and Sekiro: Shadows Die Twice won two. Activision was the most successful publisher, with five total wins, while Nintendo and ZA/UM won four.

Presenters and performers

Presenters 
The following individuals, listed in order of appearance, presented awards or introduced trailers. All other awards and trailers were presented by Goodman in the preshow and Keighley in the main show.

Performers 

The following individuals or groups performed musical numbers.

Ratings and reception

Nominees 
USgamers Eric Van Allen criticized the Game of the Year nominees for favoring The Outer Worlds over games like Disco Elysium, Fire Emblem: Three Houses, and Outer Wilds; he similarly expressed his surprise that Death Stranding received so many nominations. He appreciated the indie game nominations in most categories but felt they were unfairly ignored for Game of the Year. Game Rants Dalton Cooper named Astral Chain, Devil May Cry 5, and Fire Emblem: Three Houses the biggest snubs. Inverses Jen Glennon felt Fire Emblem: Three Houses was snubbed in categories like Best Art Direction and Best Audio Design, and considered its Best Strategy Game nomination inappropriate as it is a role-playing game. PC Gamers Andy Chalk expressed his confusion of Fresh Indie Game nominees as several had created prior games despite the category's intention for first-time developers.

Death Strandings record ten nominations prompted allegations of impropriety and a conflict of interest due to Keighley's friendly relationship with game director Hideo Kojima and his cameo appearance in the game. Keighley said he understood and appreciated the concern but reiterated he does not partake in the jury nominations or award selections, noting he intentionally distances himself due to his close working relationship with developers and publishers. Additionally, while Kojima sits on the advisory board for the Game Awards, Keighley asserted the board had no direct influence on the selections. Kotakus Heather Alexandra wrote the close relationship would continue to reflect poorly on the ceremony, regardless of Keighley's clarification.

Ceremony 
The show received a mixed reception from media publications. CNETs Jackson Ryan found the show "felt like one giant advert" but praised some of the announcements, including the Xbox Series X, Hellblade II, and Weird West, as well as the performance by Chvrches. IGNs Matt T.M. Kim similarly praised some of the surprise reveals but felt the show focused more heavily on trailers than awards. Pocket Gamers Matthew Forde wrote mobile games have no place at The Game Awards—both for announcements and awards—due to incompatible audiences; he felt a separate presentation like Nintendo Direct would be more appropriate. PC Gamers Chalk found the show lacked "mega-blockbuster game reveals" like The Elder Scrolls or Mass Effect. Vices Patrick Klepek praised Disco Elysiums awards success, and TheGamers Patricio Kobek suspected it would shape future games and hoped it would lead to more experimental developers.

Viewership 
The Game Awards 2019 was the most-viewed ceremony to date, a feat that surprised Keighley as he suspected the show had hit its peak in 2018. Over 45.2 million streams were used to view the show, an increase of 73 percent from the 2018 ceremony's 26.2 million. At its peak, the show had over 7.5 million concurrent viewers, including over 2 million across Twitch and YouTube. The show had increased viewership in China, which Keighley partly attributed to the League of Legends announcements. The increased viewership reassured Keighley that a digital show was more effective than a television broadcast. He partly attributed the viewership increase to "a general rise in live-streaming" but felt it was difficult to cite a specific factor.

Notes

References

External links

The Game Awards ceremonies
2019 awards in the United States
2019 in Los Angeles
2019 in video gaming
2019 video game awards
December 2019 events in the United States